Live at Wembley is the first live album and video by British rock band Bring Me the Horizon. It was recorded live on 5 December 2014 during the headline show at Wembley Arena in Wembley, London. The opening acts were Young Guns, Issues, and Sleepwave. The live album was released on 22 June 2015 with very few copies made, and selling out very quickly. This was the first time the band had played the song "Pray for Plagues" in over three years, and was played alongside ex-rhythm guitarist, Curtis Ward, whom they had not performed with since his departure in 2009.

Track listing

Notes
 Track 11's correct title is "Pray for Plagues".
 Track 16 was originally released as a non-album single and later re-recorded and released on That's the Spirit.

Personnel
Bring Me the Horizon
Oliver Sykes – lead vocals
Jordan Fish – keyboards, programming, percussion, backing vocals
Lee Malia – lead guitar
Matt Kean – bass
Matt Nicholls – drums
John Jones – rhythm guitar
Curtis Ward – rhythm guitar on track 11

Charts

References

Bring Me the Horizon albums
2015 live albums
Live albums recorded at Wembley Stadium